The 2017 Federated Auto Parts 400, was a Monster Energy NASCAR Cup Series race held on September 9, 2017 at Richmond Raceway in Richmond, Virginia. Contested over 403 laps -- extended from 400 laps due to an overtime finish, on the  D-shaped short track, it was the 26th race of the 2017 Monster Energy NASCAR Cup Series season, and the final race of the regular season before the playoffs.

Report

Background

Richmond Raceway (RR), formerly known as Richmond International Raceway (RIR), is a 3/4-mile (1.2 km), D-shaped, asphalt race track located just outside Richmond, Virginia in Henrico County. It hosts the Monster Energy NASCAR Cup Series and NASCAR Xfinity Series. Known as "America's premier short track", it formerly hosted a NASCAR Camping World Truck Series race, an IndyCar Series race and two USAC sprint car races.

Entry list

Practice

First practice

Final practice

Qualifying

Qualifying results

Race

Race results

Stage results

Stage 1
Laps: 100

Stage 2
Laps: 100

Final stage results

Stage 3
Laps: 204

Race statistics
 Lead changes: 7 among different drivers
 Cautions/Laps: 7 for 38
 Red flags: 0
 Time of race: 3 hours, 2 minutes and 52 seconds
 Average speed:

Media

Television
NBC Sports covered the race on the television side. Rick Allen, Jeff Burton and Steve Letarte had the call in the booth for the race. Dave Burns, Parker Kligerman, Marty Snider and Kelli Stavast reported from pit lane during the race.

Radio
The Motor Racing Network had the radio call for the race, which was simulcast on Sirius XM NASCAR Radio.

Standings after the race

Drivers' Championship standings after Playoffs reset

Manufacturers' Championship standings

Note: Only the first 16 positions are included for the driver standings.

References

Federated Auto Parts 400
Federated Auto Parts 400
NASCAR races at Richmond Raceway
Federated Auto Parts 400